The Dust of Years is the third studio album by the British Christian metal band Seventh Angel, released on 24 June 2009 on Bombworks Records. A comeback album, The Dust of Years is the band's first studio album since 1992's Lament for the Weary. While the style continues on Seventh Angel's trademark thrash and doom metal sound, the vocals are death growls as opposed to the previous thrash metal shouts. The album was produced by Esoteric member Greg Chandler who also contributed some growls. The cover art was done by Matt Vickerstaff of Darkwave Art.

Track listing 
"Chaos of Dreams" – 5:08
"The Turning Tide" – 4:59
"Exordium" – 6:05
"Weep Not for Us" – 6:10
"Abélard and Heloise" – 6:30
"In Ruins" – 7:10
"Lamentations" – 7:33
"The Raven Sky" – 10:04
"Oświęcim" – 5:28

Personnel 
Seventh Angel
Ian Arkley: Vocals, guitars
Tank (aka Andrew Thompson): Drums
Simon Bibby: Guitar, vocals, keyboard
Mark Broomhead: Bass, narration on "Abélard and Heloise"

Additional musicians
Cat Brazier: Flute on "The Raven Sky"
Peter Spencer: Narration on "Oświęcim"
Kate Hamilton (My Silent Wake): Narration on "Abélard and Heloise"
Greg Chandler (Esoteric): Guest growls

References

Seventh Angel albums
2009 albums